The Zapadnaya Litsa is a river in the north of the Kola Peninsula in Murmansk Oblast, Russia. The Zapadnaya Litsa River originates on the Kuchintundra and flows into the Barents Sea. Its biggest tributary is the Lebyazhka River.

 
From 1941 to 1944, the Litsa River formed the Arctic frontline between German and Finnish troops west of the river – trying to capture Murmansk – and Soviet troops on the east, defending the city. This frontier was of vital importance for both sides, as Murmansk was the only Soviet harbour left in Europe and the northern route to Murmansk and Arkhangelsk supplied the Soviet Union with approximately 25% of all lend-lease aid. During the stalemate that lasted four years, thousands perished in the tundras on both sides of the river. At the time the Litsa valley was called Death Valley (Долина смерти, Dolina smerti) by the Soviets; though later the expression Valley of Honor (Долина славы, Dolina slavy) became fashionable. 
The defense of Murmansk succeeded; the Germans never reached the city and the supply lines were not seriously interrupted, although the Germans bombed Murmansk to rubble from occupied Norway. See also: Operation Silver Fox and Operation Platinum Fox.
The remains of the WW II fighting (trenches, pillboxes, defense pits etc.) can be visited with some specialised travel agencies.

Memorial for the Defenders of the Soviet Arctic on Litsa River (images)

References 

Rivers of Murmansk Oblast
Drainage basins of the Barents Sea